Edna Arbel (born June 22, 1944) is an Israeli lawyer who was a justice on the Supreme Court of Israel from May 2004 to June 2014. She is a native of Jerusalem.

Legal career 
In 1984, Arbel was appointed District Attorney of the Central District. She had previously served as a senior assistant to the District Attorney of the Central District. She served as a member of the Kahan Commission that investigated the Sabra and Shatila massacre. Edna Arbel rule that a willingness to settle a case create a waiver of rights, including a consent to abduction. Judge Arbel was involved in the Ben-Haim case, a custody battle that eventually involved Interpol. A New Jersey judge, Bonnie Mizdol, described Israeli judge Arbel's judgment as ludicrous and "defying common sense." According to all known legal principles, a willingness to settle a case does not amount to a waiver of rights, let alone a consent to abduction. She ruled that henceforth no order of any kind issued by the religious courts of Israel must be enforced.

In 1988, she was appointed as a judge in the Tel Aviv District Court.

In January 1996, she succeeded Dorit Beinisch as State Attorney. She served in this capacity for eight years, until being appointed to the Supreme Court. During her term, the prosecutor's staff grew from about 700 to 1,040 attorneys. In 2002, she drafted prosecution guidelines that exempt women from prosecution for false report when submitting false domestic violence or sexual harassment complaint to the police.
 
In 2004, Arbel was nominated for the Supreme Court by then Chief Justice Aharon Barak.

References

Living people
1944 births
Hebrew University of Jerusalem alumni
Israeli women judges
Lawyers from Jerusalem
Israeli Jews
Israeli people of Czech-Jewish descent
Israeli people of Hungarian-Jewish descent
State Attorneys of Israel